Rock Grove is an unincorporated community in Stephenson County, Illinois,  east of Orangeville. It is in Dakota Community Unit School District 201.

References

Unincorporated communities in Stephenson County, Illinois
Unincorporated communities in Illinois